Kew railway station was opened by the North and South Western Junction Railway in 1853 in Brentford in west London on the western curve of the Kew triangle. It closed in 1862 after the railway had in 1862 opened its Kew Bridge platforms (closed since 1940) on the eastern curve and which were connected to the LSWR Kew Bridge station, itself on the southern chord.

Although Kew and Kew Bridge are applied to structures on the north bank of the Thames Kew does not extend across the river.

Potential reopening

The feasibility study stated was a good business case for a station but noted that the station is not required in order to open the line.

References

External links
 http://findmapplaces.com/14798405_Old+Kew+Station (which is in Russian) has a photograph of "Old Kew Station" and a location overlaid on a modern map.

Disused railway stations in the London Borough of Hounslow
Former North and South Western Junction Railway stations
Railway stations in Great Britain opened in 1853
Railway stations in Great Britain closed in 1862
1853 establishments in England